The Manor Lakes Football Club is an Australian rules football club which compete in the Western Region Football League since 2013. They are based in the Melbourne suburb of Manor Lakes.

History
Manor Lakes initially aimed to start a junior club for the 2013 season, but soon found demand for a senior game was also high in booming outer Melbourne suburb of Wyndhamvale.
When the committee was first formed the aim was to provide for junior football in the area. But the overwhelming response to the Manor Lakes Facebook page  and a few other outlets was too much to ignore so the committee set about bringing on senior football.

Manor Lakes developed a club jumper and Heath Hunter was appointed senior coach. fourteen players transferred with him from Trentham (in the MCDFL) . A further eighteen players have transferred from neighbouring clubs.

The club was admitted to WRFL 2nd Division for 2013. As of 2020 the senior side is in recess.

Bibliography
 History of football in Melbourne's north west by John Stoward –

References

External links
Official Club Website

Australian rules football clubs in Melbourne
Australian rules football clubs established in 2012
2012 establishments in Australia
Western Region Football League clubs
Sport in the City of Wyndham